The Ansgar's Church was a church building in Vättersnäs in Jönköping, Sweden. It belonged to Mission Covenant Church of Sweden, which in October 2012 joined the Uniting Church in Sweden.

It was inaugurated on 17 October 1965. On the night before Tuesday, 3 August 2021, the church was destroyed by a fire.

According to a police report published on 12 August the same year, the fire was caused following a lightning strike. This conclusion has later been questioned, as no thunder was recorded by the SMHI, and because of witnesses of firework explosions.

References

External links
official website 

20th-century Protestant churches
Churches in Jönköping
Uniting Church in Sweden churches
21st-century churches in Sweden
Churches completed in 1965
2021 fires in Europe
Buildings and structures demolished in 2021